Hydrelia gracilipennis is a moth in the family Geometridae first described by Hiroshi Inoue in 1982. It is found in Japan.

The wingspan is 15–18 mm.

References

Moths described in 1982
Asthenini
Moths of Japan